Pat Johnson (born 17 March 1960) is a former American rugby union player. He played at Hooker for the United States at two World Cups, in 1987 and 1991. He made his test debut for the United States against Canada in Vancouver on 10 May 1987. His last test match was also against Canada in Denver, 13 June 1992.

References

External links 
ESPN Scrum Profile

1960 births
American rugby union players
United States international rugby union players
Rugby union hookers
Living people